Rise of the Gargoyles ( in France) is a 2009 television film directed by Bill Corcoran and produced for the Syfy channel. It is the 18th film in the Maneater series.

Plot
In Paris, France, two workers find a hidden chamber while digging beneath the Saint Jean André Church. They collect the valuable objects in the area, but they are attacked by a creature. Meanwhile, the discredited Professor Jack Randall, who wrote a book about gargoyles rejected by the experts, is encouraged by his friend Carol Beckham to check the place out. They sneak into the site during the night and while Carol is collecting some artifacts, Jack is recording with his camera. Out of the blue, Jack sees a winged monster coming towards him and he flees from the location with Carol but breaks his camera. They go to a bar and a huge stone falls over onto his car. Jack takes a cab to his boarding house and Carol is attacked and beheaded by a gargoyle at her apartment.

The next morning, Jack identifies Carol's body and becomes the prime suspect of Inspector Gibert in several murders. Jack decides to seek out the reporter of a sensationalist newspaper, Nicole Ricard, and gives his tape to her cameraman Walsh. When Walsh recovers the badly shaped footage, he shows Nicole and they realize that Jack is not crazy, and he had indeed seen a gargoyle beneath the church. They decide to return to the church to investigate.

Cast
 Eric Balfour as Professor Jack Randall
 Caroline Néron as Nicole Ricard
 Justin Salinger as Walsh
 Ifan Huw Dafydd as Inspector Gibert
 Nick Mancuso as Father Gable
 Tanya Clarke as Carol Beckham
 Constantin Barbulescu as Workman #1
 Gabriel Spahiu as Workman #2
 Lucian Ciurariu as Bum
 Alexandra Buza as Rock Chick
 Flaviu Crisan as CSI Officer
 Paul Niculita as Gibert's Assistant
 Florin Busuioc as Cop
 Mihai Diaconu as Pizza Man
 Benoît Rousseau as Inspector Gibert (voice)

Home media
Rise of the Gargoyles was released on DVD on September 8, 2009, in North America. In Japan, it was titled as: U.M.A 2010 and released on January 8, 2010 on direct-to-DVD.

External links

Syfy original films
2009 television films
2009 films
English-language Canadian films
2000s English-language films
English-language French films
English-language Romanian films
American science fiction television films
Canadian science fiction television films
French science fiction films
Romanian science fiction films
Maneater (film series)
Gargoyles in popular culture
Films directed by Bill Corcoran
Films set in Paris
2000s American films
2000s Canadian films
2000s French films